Periods. is a comedy film series and collective created by Victor Quinaz and Anna Martemucci. Semi-improvised and cinematic in their approach, their anachronistic style has been applied to various epochs (Viking Wives, Pilgrims) and adaptations of literary classics such as East of Eden, Ethan Frome, Little Women, and Bright Lights, Big City.

Production
The series is primarily directed by Victor Quinaz, edited by Charlie Porter and Giovanni P Autran, with cinematography by Giovanni P Autran. Periods is co-produced with Robinson Films, Nomadic Films and Before the Door Pictures.

Cast
The shorts have featured a variety of celebrity cameos including Zachary Quinto (who also is credited as executive producer), Penn Badgley, YouTube star Grace Helbig Pablo Schreiber, and Willie Garson.

The main ensemble consists of Philip Quinaz, Alison Fyhrie, Anna Martemucci, Brian Shoaf, Mary Grill, Giovanni P. Autran, Matt Hobby, Julie Ann Dulude, Damian Lanigan, and Chris Manley.

Videos

In addition, the Re: Creation  and Lil Women short films both led to spin-off series Talking with God and Lil Women: THe Series produced and published to the Periods. Films YouTube channel.

Podcast

Periods. has only produced and recorded one podcast, "The Podcast of Anne Frank", which was published on December 14, 2012.

Feature
In the summer of 2013, Periods. Films released their first feature film in theaters and digital entitled Breakup At A Wedding produced by Before the Door Pictures and Anonymous Content distributed by Oscilloscope Laboratories.

Press
The series has been featured on several blogs and news outlets such as New York Magazine, Entertainment Weekly, LA Times, and was rated by Time Out NY as the #15 funniest web series. The series has also been honored at the HollyShorts Film Festival as well as featured at the Raindance Film Festival in London and the Berkshire International Film Festival in conjunction with Edith Wharton's estate the Mount.

References

External links 
 
 
 PERIODS. on YouTube

American comedy web series